From A to...Z is an album by the Al Cohn/Zoot Sims Sextet recorded in early 1956 for the RCA Victor label.

Reception

The Allmusic review by Scott Yanow stated " Al and Zoot avoid obvious material ("Somebody Loves Me" and "East of the Sun" are the only standards) in favor of swinging "modern" originals."

Track listing
 "Mediolistic" (Osie Johnson) - 3:29
 "Crimea River" (Ralph Burns) - 3:08
 "A New Moan" (Manny Albam) - 3:52
 "A Moment's Notice" (Ernie Wilkins) - 3:19
 "My Blues" (Al Cohn) - 3:14
 "Sandy's Swing" (Milt Gold) - 3:23
 "Somebody Loves Me" (George Gershwin, Buddy DeSylva, Ballard MacDonald) - 2:51 	
 "More Bread" (Wilkins) - 3:05 	
 "Sherm's Terms" (Dick Sherman) - 2:57
 "From A to Z" (Cohn) - 2:57
 "East of the Sun (and West of the Moon)" (Brooks Bowman) - 4:19
 "Tenor for Two Please, Jack" (Zoot Sims) - 4:25 	
 "My Blues" [Alternate take] (Cohn) - 4:17 Bonus track on CD reissue
 "More Bread" [Alternate take] (Wilkins) - 3:09 Bonus track on CD reissue 	
 "Tenor for Two Please, Jack" [Alternate take] (Sims) - 4:17 Bonus track on CD reissue
 "Somebody Loves Me" [Alternate take] (Gershwin, DeSylva, MacDonald) - 3:05 Bonus track on CD reissue
Recorded at Webster Hall in New York City on January 23, 1956 (tracks 1-3) and January 24, 1956 (tracks 4-16)

Personnel 
Al Cohn, Zoot Sims - tenor saxophone
Dick Sherman - trumpet
Hank Jones (tracks 7, 10-12, 15 & 16), Dave McKenna (tracks 1-6, 8, 9, 13 & 14) - piano
Milt Hinton - bass
Osie Johnson - drums

References 

1957 albums
RCA Records albums
Al Cohn albums
Zoot Sims albums